Events from the year 1689 in Denmark.

Incumbents
 Monarch – Christian V

Events

 April 19 – Sophie Amalienborg burns down when a stage decoration catches fire during an opera performance in connection with the king's birthday a few days earlier. 170 people are killed, including many prominent citizens.
 November 10 – Reformed Church in Copenhagen is consecrated.

Births

Deaths
 March 26 – Gabriel Milan, governor (born c. 1631)
 October – Christopher Heins, Governor-General of The Danish West Indies

See also

References

 
Denmark
Years of the 17th century in Denmark